The 1907 World Greco-Roman Wrestling Championship were held in Frankfurt, Germany in May 1907.

Medal table

Medal summary

Men's Greco-Roman

Participating nations
26 competitors from 3 nations participated.

 (4)
 (19)
 (3)

References
UWW Database

World Wrestling Championships
W
1907
W
Sports competitions in Frankfurt
20th century in Frankfurt